Charana mandarinus, the mandarin blue, is a butterfly in the family Lycaenidae. It is found in the Indomalayan realm.

The larvae feed on Loranthus species.

Subspecies
The following subspecies are recognised:
Charana mandarinus mandarinus (Sikkim, Bhutan, Assam, Burma, Thailand)
Charana mandarinus splendida Moulton, 1911 (Borneo, Peninsular Malaya, possibly Sumatra)

References

External links
 Charana at Markku Savela's Lepidoptera and Some Other Life Forms

Butterflies described in 1863
Iolaini
Butterflies of Borneo
Butterflies of Asia
Taxa named by William Chapman Hewitson